General César Augusto Astudillo Salcedo is a Peruvian General, who serves as the incumbent Chief of the Joint Command of the Peruvian Armed Forces since October 2018. Prior to his post, he served as the General Commander of the Peruvian Army in December 2017.

Early life and education

He was born in Lima, Peru, on September 30, 1960, and entered the Chorrillos Military School in February 1979, before graduating in the "Héroes de la Breña" class of 1983. He graduated as a Systems Engineer, and holds a Master's degree in Administration and in Military Sciences. He also attended the Advanced Business Management Program (PADE) at the ESAN Business School and the Senior Management Program at the University of Piura. He also took courses locally and abroad such as the Weapons Course in Fort Gulick, Panama and the Resource Management Course and the Advanced Informatics Course at Fort Benning, Georgia in the United States. He is trained in Parachuting, Jumping Master, Free Fall, Regular Command Course and Armored Courses.  He also graduated from the LVI Course on Command and General Staff at the United States Army War College, and the Higher Course in Psychological Operations and in the CAEN as a participant in the Defense and National Development Course.

Military career

He graduated as an infantry officer in 1983, and was assigned to command various army units, particularly in infantry and special forces units. In 1995, he was involved in the Cenepa War, serving the Commando Battalion No. 19., and also led the Capture of Miguel Rincón from the MRTA, and in 1997, he, then a Major, was appointed to integrate the Intervention Force to rescue the 72 hostages that were held captive. On April 22, the date on which the “Chavín de Huántar” Rescue Operation was carried out, and  joined the “ALFA” rescue patrol, whose mission was to rescue hostages on the 1st floor of the residence. Given his specialty in Command and training in rescue operations. On April 22, the date on which the “Chavín de Huántar” Rescue Operation was carried out, he joined the “ALFA” rescue patrol, whose mission was to rescue hostages on the 1st floor of the residence of the Japanese Ambassador to Peru.

He was also involved in Operation "Cerco", by leading the capturing Óscar Ramírez Durand (Feliciano) in 1999, and in Operation "Peru", where he led the capture of DT Florindo Eleuterio Flores Hala (Artemio), in 2012, as commander of the 3rd Special Forces Brigade.

In 2014, he was appointed the Chief of the Joint Chiefs of Staff of the VRAEM Special Command, and in June of the same year, he was appointed General Commander of CE-VRAEM. In 2015, he was appointed as the Inspector General of the Army until in December 2017 he was appointed as General Commander of the Peruvian Army, before being appointed as the Chief of the Joint Command of the Peruvian Armed Forces on October 30, 2018. During his term as Chief of the Joint Command, he led various operations in terrorism and military enforcement during the COVID-19 pandemic.

Awards in military service
 Mariscal Cáceres-Distinguido
 Mariscal Cáceres-Honor
 "Cross of Courage" medal 
 Decoration of the Joint Command in the Grade of Grand Cross 
 Francisco Bolognesi Military Order for Operations in the Huallaga. 
 Military Order Francisco Bolognesi in the degree of GRAN CRUZ
 Peruvian Cross Medal for Military Merit in the GRAN CRUZ degree
 Order Peruvian Cross to the Naval Merit - Grade of Grand CROIX- Distantivo White 
 Captain Quiñones order in the Grade of Grand Cross 
 Medal of General Merit FAP Armando Revoredo Iglesias ”in the“ Gran Cruz ”Class
 Military Merit award to Colonel Eduardo Abaroa, the Armed Forces of the State of Bolivia in the Grade of Grand Cross
 Academic Medal of the Army in the degree of Merit
Medal to the Combatant Mariscal Cáceres in the degree of Honor
 Diploma and Medal to the winners of Cenepa 
 Naval Medal of Honor to the Merit by the Navy - Merit value 
 Medal to the Defender of Democracy. CROSS 
 National Pacification Belt - HONOR - 2015
 Diploma to the Defender of the Fatherland - Winners of Alto Cenepa 
 Diploma of the Council of the Medal of Honor of the Congress of the Republic of Peru

Distinctions
 Argentine Medal for Academic Excellence
 COINDE plaque of honor for having obtained the first place in the Systems Engineering career
 Distinction of the Republic of Bolivia from the Military Institute of Engineers
 Chilean Army Award
 Distinction of the General Staff of the Army of the Federative Republic of Brazil
 Decoration of the San Martiniano Institute of Peru
 Diploma and Medal of Honor for Merit from the Peruvian Journalists Association -2018
 Diploma from the San Martín University in the San Martín region at the service of the Community

References

1960 births
Living people
Peruvian generals